WNNS (98.7 MHz) is a commercial FM radio station licensed to Springfield, Illinois, and serving the Springfield metropolitan area.  The station is currently owned by Long Nine, Inc.  It broadcasts an hot adult contemporary radio format, switching to Christmas music for much of November and December.  The radio studios and offices are on North Third Street in Riverton, Illinois.

WNNS has an effective radiated power (ERP) of 50,000 watts, the current maximum for most FM stations in Illinois.  The transmitter is on Mansion Road in Curran, Illinois.

History
It was formerly known as "Lite Rock 99" from the 1980s through the late 2000s.

References

External links

NNS